Daviesia costata is a species of flowering plant in the family Fabaceae and is endemic to the south-west of Western Australia. It is a straggling, multi-stemmed shrub with scattered, erect, linear phyllodes, and yellow and dark red flowers.

Description

Taxonomy
Davieia costata was first formally described in 1920 by Edwin Cheel in the Journal and Proceedings of the Royal Society of Western Australia based on specimens collected by Max Koch "at Queenswood, on the Preston Valley Railway". The specific epithet (costata) mean "ribbed", referring to the stems.

Distribution and habitat
This daviesia usually grows in open forest on sandy soil on flat and sloping sites between Toodyay and the Blackwood River on the Darling Range to Corrigin and Katanning, in the Avon Wheatbelt, Jarrah Forest and Swan Coastal Plain biogeographic regions of south-western Western Australia.

Conservation status
Daviesia costata is listed as "not threatened" by the Department of Biodiversity, Conservation and Attractions.

References

costata
Rosids of Western Australia
Plants described in 1920
Taxa named by Edwin Cheel